The Barber Dam is a timber-crib dam in the western United States, on the Boise River in southwestern Idaho. A power plant was also constructed in conjunction with the dam which powered the mill and the town of Barberton (Barber), which was established in 1910.

In 1934, the Great Depression effected the closure of the mill and the facilities were purchased by Boise Cascade. The Harris Ranch purchased the dam and mill after the depression and developed the area for residential property.
The dam was purchased by Ada County in 1977 and is currently regulated by the Idaho Department of Water Resources.

The run-of-the-river dam's power house contains two Kaplan turbine generators with a combined capacity of 4.14 MW and is operated by Enel Green Power. The dam and lumber mill were added to the National Register of Historic Places on November 21, 1978.

References

Dams in Idaho
Dams on the Boise River
Hydroelectric power plants in Idaho
Buildings and structures in Ada County, Idaho
Run-of-the-river power stations
Dams completed in 1906
Dams on the National Register of Historic Places in Idaho
1906 establishments in Idaho
Energy infrastructure completed in 1906
National Register of Historic Places in Ada County, Idaho